Century House may refer to:

 Century House (Ridgeway, South Carolina), a historic plantation house in the U.S.
 Century House, London, a building on Westminster Bridge Road, London, England
 Century House (Manchester), demolished to build Two St Peter's Square, Manchester, England
 "Century House", an unmade episode of Doctor Who

See also
 New Century House, an office in Manchester, England